Siphonaria australis is a species of air-breathing sea snail or false limpet, a marine pulmonate gastropod mollusc in the family Siphonariidae, the false limpets.

Distribution
This marine species is endemic to New Zealand.

References

 Powell A. W. B., New Zealand Mollusca, William Collins Publishers Ltd, Auckland, New Zealand 1979 
 Dayrat, B.; Goulding, T. C.; White, T. R. (2014). Diversity of Indo-West Pacific Siphonaria (Mollusca: Gastropoda: Euthyneura). Zootaxa. 3779(2): 246-276
 Spencer, H.G., Marshall, B.A. & Willan, R.C. (2009). Checklist of New Zealand living Mollusca. pp 196–219. in: Gordon, D.P. (ed.) New Zealand inventory of biodiversity. Volume one. Kingdom Animalia: Radiata, Lophotrochozoa, Deuterostomia. Canterbury University Press, Christchurch.
 Dayrat, B.; Goulding, T. C.; White, T. R. (2014). Diversity of Indo-West Pacific Siphonaria (Mollusca: Gastropoda: Euthyneura). Zootaxa. 3779(2): 246-276

External links
 Quoy, J. R. C. & Gaimard, J. P. (1832-1835). Voyage de la corvette l'Astrolabe : exécuté par ordre du roi, pendant les années 1826-1827-1828-1829, sous le commandement de M. J. Dumont d'Urville. Zoologie
 Gould, A. A. (1846). Descriptions of new shells, collected by the United States Exploring Expedition. Proceedings of the Boston Society of Natural History. 2: 141-145, 148-152 
 Reeve, L. A. (1856). Monograph of the genus Siphonaria. In: Conchologia Iconica, or, illustrations of the shells of molluscous animals, vol. 9, pl. 1-7 and unpaginated text. L. Reeve & Co., London.
  Suter H. (1909). Description of new species and subspecies of New Zealand Mollusca, with notes on a few species. Proceedings of the Malacological Society of London. 8: 253-265
 Spencer H.G., Willan R.C., Marshall B.A. & Murray T.J. (2011). Checklist of the Recent Mollusca Recorded from the New Zealand Exclusive Economic Zone
 Dayrat, B.; Goulding, T. C.; White, T. R. (2014). Diversity of Indo-West Pacific Siphonaria (Mollusca: Gastropoda: Euthyneura). Zootaxa. 3779(2): 246-276

Siphonariidae
Gastropods described in 1833